The Concours de violoncelle Rostropovitch, (Cello Competition Mstislav Rostropovich), is an international cello competition established in 1977 by the city of Paris.

See also 
 List of classical music competitions

References 

Classical music awards
Music in Paris
Music competitions in France
1977 establishments in France